Maths Mansion is a British educational television series for school Years 4 to 6 (nine to eleven year olds) that ran from 19 September 2001 to 26 March 2003. Produced by Channel 4 by Open Mind, It follows the adventures of "Bad Man" taking kids to his mansion, Maths Mansion. There, the kids learn and are tested on maths every week; if they pass the quiz, they get a "Maths Card". 

The kids are not allowed to leave the mansion until they get enough Maths Cards. They do not always pass the test, and this is shown in various episodes, one of them being Angleman!. Frequently interrupting each programme is another programme, about "Sad Man", who seems to be quite happy. He demonstrates maths with songs, puppets, and games. 

Sad Man has a puppet called "Decimole", as for him being a mole. Decimole is known for attacking people; in the final episode, Bad Man digs up Decimole, and Decimole kills Bad Man. There were forty episodes in four seasons. Each episode is about ten minutes long and comes with a teacher's guide and activity book and three activity sheets of differing levels for kids to use in class.

Characters
The main characters of Maths Mansion (other than the several kids in each episode) are Bad Man and Sad Man. Bad Man is the game show host who traps the kids and does not let them leave until they acquire Maths Cards that are earned in his game show. One of Bad Man's catchphrases, "No Leaving Without Learning," sums up his attitude towards the kids and his role in the show. 

Sad Man, a dated, uncharismatic, leather elbow patch wearing alter ego of Bad Man from the seventies, regularly interrupts Bad Man's programming with informational broadcasts that help the kids learn how to leave the mansion and teaches the lesson to the kids watching the show. Sad Man brings with him several minor characters such as Decimole and Snorter the Pig, a collection of puppets. Sad Man also occasionally has other alter egos himself such as Angleman, who is the namesake for one episode 5 of season 3.

Other than Bad Man, Sad Man, and the kids, other characters include:
 Decimole
 Miss Sniff
 Angleman
 Mr. Girhalf
 Third Bird
 Twelfth Elf
 Not the Great Big Hen
 Snorter

Episodes

Season 1 
Season 1 is an introduction to the number system and general mathematics.

Season 2 
Season 2 is focused on doing simple mathematical calculations.

Season 3 
Season 3 is focused on numbers and the number system, including natural numbers, integers, and rational numbers.

Season 4 
Season 4 is focused on geometry, specifically shape, space, and problem solving using those ideas.

External links
Channel 4 Learning - Maths Mansion, an archive of the former official website.

References

 Discovery Education Search
Episode 35, Angleman!

Mathematics education television series
British children's education television series